is a Japanese anime television series produced by Studio 3Hz and Actas. The series was directed by Masaki Tachibana and written by Ichirō Ōkouchi, with original character designs by Kouhaku Kuroboshi and Yukie Akiya, and music by Yuki Kajiura. It was also partly inspired by the American novel The Prince and the Pauper.

The series aired from July to September 2017. The first two installments of a six-part sequel film series Princess Principal: Crown Handler have also been released. A mobile game, Princess Principal: Game of Mission, was launched in August 2017, and was available until December 28, 2018.

Plot
Princess Principal is set in a fictional analogue of Britain called Albion. During the early 20th century, the Kingdom of Albion monopolized a mysterious substance called "Cavorite" to construct a fleet of heavily armed airships that made Albion the dominant power in the world. However, the proletariat of Albion grew angry at their country's ruling class for largely ignoring their plight, sparking the "London Revolution" in which the lower classes attempted to overthrow the royal family. Eventually, the two sides reached a stalemate, and a great wall was erected through the middle of London, splitting Albion into two nations: the Commonwealth and the Kingdom.

Several years later, the Commonwealth launches "Operation Changeling", a plan to replace the Kingdom's Princess Charlotte with Ange, a girl who bears a strong resemblance to her, in order to have a highly placed agent within the royal family. However, the Princess turns the plan on the spies, offering to work with the Commonwealth if Ange and her friends will help her become the Queen of the Kingdom. So begins the story as five girls, including the Princess herself, serve as undercover spies in the Kingdom working for the Commonwealth, while enrolled as students at the prestigious Queen's Mayfair school.

Characters

Main characters

 The main protagonist and a 17-year-old spymaster who can change her personality almost at whim to whatever is required for her mission. She is adept at both telling and detecting lies, often hiding her true knowledge as tales from the "Black Lizard Planet." She also possesses stolen prototype Cavorite technology that allows her to increase or decrease the gravity of herself and anything she touches when active. It is later revealed that she was born as the true princess of Albion. Because of the revolution, she was stuck with her current persona while her lookalike took her place in the castle. Her sidearm of choice is a Webley–Fosbery Automatic Revolver.

Like Ange, Princess Charlotte is 17-years-old. She is the niece of the Duke of Normandy and fourth in the line of succession for the throne of the Albion Kingdom. The Princess has a relatively calm and disarming demeanor, and easily gets along well with others. Her dream is to become Queen and re-unify the country. Her grandmother, the Queen, bears a very close resemblance to Queen Victoria in the latter part of her reign. It is revealed later on that she is the real Ange who befriended the princess and like the princess got stuck in her assumed identity because of the revolution. Her sidearm of choice is a Schönberger-Laumann 1892.

A 20-year-old undercover student who loves drinking wine and booze, even though her teammates are too young to do so. She also has a bright personality. Dorothy uses her feminine charm in missions and is good at shooting and driving vehicles. Her real name is Daisy MacBean, who changed her name and fled after her mother died and her father constantly abused her in a drunken rage. "Dorothy" is her mother's name. Her sidearm of choice is possibly a revolver that chambered in .410 bore.

The 15-year-old scion of a prestigious family who serves as the Princess' aide and close friend. She can mimic the voices of other people using a mechanism that her father implanted in her throat, after he treated her as a test subject for his experiments.

A 16-year-old exchange student from Saga, Japan, who originally joined the team to protect a Japanese diplomat from an assassin who was related to her. She is highly proficient in samurai-style swordsmanship and is considered the strongest of the spies in melee combat. She often acts naive and has a hard time adapting to the culture differences. She is a spy for Japan tasked with observing the Commonwealth and Kingdom so that her superiors can determine which country to ally with.

Supporting characters

The head of Control, the intelligence unit handling Principal Team. 

A member of Control, the intelligence unit handling Principal Team. 

A member of Control and the Commonwealth military's representative. 

The Home Secretary of the Albion Kingdom and Princess Charlotte's uncle. He handles the Kingdom's espionage affairs and personally has hunted down potential defectors from the Kingdom, either to use them for counter-espionage against the Commonwealth's agents or kill them outright.

One of the Duke of Normandy's most-trusted agents, a dark-skinned woman who collects information and can kill anyone who poses a threat to her employer.

Media

Anime
The anime series is animated by Studio 3Hz and Actas. The series is directed by Masaki Tachibana, with scripts written by Ichirō Ōkouchi and character designs by Kouhaku Kuroboshi and Yukie Akiya. The series aired from July 9 to September 24, 2017. The opening theme song is "The Other Side of the Wall" performed by Void_Chords and MARU, and the ending theme is "A Page of My Story" performed by Ayaka Imamura, Akira Sekine, Yō Taichi, Akari Kageyama, and Nozomi Furuki. Sentai Filmworks has licensed the anime and streamed it on Amazon Prime Video in the U.S. and other streaming sites elsewhere. MVM Films has licensed the series in the UK. Medialink licensed the series in South Asia and Southeast Asia and is streaming it on Ani-One Asia YouTube channel.

Episode list
The series aired in an anachronical order, represented by each episode's "case" number.

Notes: A = episode number, C = chronological order.

Mobile game
A mobile puzzle game titled Princess Principal Game of Mission was released for iOS and Android phones. The game was in operation from August 2017 to December 28, 2018, with certain offline features being added after the game's servers shut down.

Films

A six-part anime film adaptation of the series titled Princess Principal: Crown Handler was announced on April 29, 2018. The series follows on from the events of the last episode of the series. Actas produces the film series, while Noboru Kimura replaced Ichirō Ōkouchi as scriptwriter. The rest of the cast and staff, with the exception of Ayaka Imamura, returned to reprise their roles for the films. The first film was slated to be released on April 10, 2020, but was postponed to February 11, 2021 due to the COVID-19 pandemic. The second film premiered on September 23, 2021.  Sentai Filmworks also licensed the films.

Manga
A manga adaptation by Ryou Akizuki began serialization in Tokuma Shoten's Monthly Comic Ryū website on November 8, 2019. The chapters have been compiled into a single volume as of March 13, 2020.

Reception
Princess Principal has garnered significant praise from critics, with many calling it one of the best anime of 2017. Kotaku picked it as one of best summer 2017 anime series, with writer Cecilia D'Anastasio noting that the "soundtrack is jazzy madness. Its animation is pure beauty. It’s full of sharp writing, surprises and edge-of-your-seat intrigue."

The music gained positive comments, especially the opening theme song to the series, "The Other Side of the Wall". The song was named by Chris Farris and Theron Martin from Anime News Network as the best theme song of 2017. It was also nominated for the best opening song at the 2017 Crunchyroll Anime Awards.

Notes

References

External links
 
 

2017 anime television series debuts
3Hz
Actas
Anime composed by Yuki Kajiura
Anime Strike
Anime with original screenplays
Bandai Namco franchises
Espionage in anime and manga
Historical anime and manga
Historical television series
Japanese webcomics
Medialink
Seinen manga
Sentai Filmworks
Steampunk anime and manga
Television series set in the 19th century
Television shows set in London
Television shows written by Ichirō Ōkouchi
Tokuma Shoten manga
Tokyo MX original programming
Webcomics in print
Works based on The Prince and the Pauper